Charles Vinson Graham Jr. (born February 26, 1951) is an American politician who served as a member of the North Carolina House of Representatives from the 47th district. A member of the Lumbee tribe, Graham is the only Native American who was serving in the General Assembly.

Career
Graham is a former member of the Election Law Committee in the North Carolina State House of Representatives, and of the Subcommittee on Business and Labor in the North Carolina State House of Representatives. He also now serves on seven legislative committees: he is Vice Chair of the Agriculture committee, he serves on the Appropriations committee, he serves as the vice chair of the committee for Commerce and Job Development, he is a member of the insurance committee, he serves in the Subcommittee on Appropriations, Justice and Public Safety, he serves in the Subcommittee on Education, K-12, and also in the Transportation committee.

During the 2016 legislative session, Graham was one of 11 Democrats to vote in favor of the House Bill 2, the controversial "Bathroom Bill." In October 2021, Graham issued an apology for voting in favor of the bill.

2022 congressional campaign
On October 5, 2021, Graham announced he was running for Congress in North Carolina's 9th congressional district. His campaign video went viral on Twitter, where it received over 5 million views.

Following redistricting, however, Graham switched to the 7th congressional district.

Electoral history

2022

2020

2018

2016

2014

2012

2010

2008

References

External links

Charles Graham for Congress campaign website
Representative Charles Graham official legislative website

1951 births
21st-century American politicians
21st-century Native Americans
Appalachian State University alumni
Candidates in the 2022 United States House of Representatives elections
Lehigh University alumni
Living people
Lumbee people
Democratic Party members of the North Carolina House of Representatives
Native American state legislators
University of North Carolina at Pembroke alumni